Rish ( Riš) is a village in Smyadovo Municipality, Shumen Province, Bulgaria, with a population of 604 as of 2019.

Population 
According to the 2011 Census, the population of Rish consists mainly of Bulgarian Turks (72.6%), followed by a Bulgarian minority (28.9%).

The population is gradually decreasing after the end of the Second World War.

Villages in Shumen Province